Udma is a census town in Kasaragod district in the Indian state of Kerala.

Demographics
As of 2011 India census, Udma census town had population of 8,115  which constitutes 3,593 males and 4,522 females. Udma census town spreads over an area of 4.53 km2 with 1,669 families residing in it. The sex ratio was 1258 higher than state average of 1084. Population of children in the age group 0-6 was 1,072 (13.2%) where 523 are males and 549 females. Udma town had overall literacy of 90.3% lower than state average of 94%. The male literacy stands at 94.8% and female literacy was 86.8%.

Udma Grama Panchayat comprises Udma and Bare census towns and Kottikulam village in its jurisdiction. Uduma Panchayat had total population of 37,537 where 20,919 people live in urban areas and 16,618 live in rural areas.

Religions
As of 2011 India census, Uduma census town had total population of 8,115, among which 5,106 were Hindus (62.9%), 2,966 Muslims (36.5%), 0.36% Christians and 0.2% others.

Administration

 District: Kasargod
 Taluk/Tehsil: Hosdurg
 Block: Kanhangad
 Assembly Constituency: Udma
 Parliament Constituency: Kasargod
 Police Station:  Bekal
 Post Office:  671 319
 Telephone Exchange:  udma. 0467
 Nearest Railway Station:  Kottikulam

Major organizations in Udma
 SI-MET Nursing College
 Vivanta Taj Beach Resort
 State Bank of India, Uduma
 Syndicate Bank, Uduma
 Vijaya Bank, Uduma
 Federal Bank, Uduma
 Dhanlaxmi Bank, Uduma
 Indian Overseas Bank, Uduma

Transportation
Local roads have access to NH 66 which connects to Mangalore in the north and Calicut in the south. The nearest railway station is Kottikulam on Shoranur-Mangalore Section under southern railway. There are airports at Mangalore and Calicut.

References

External links

Kanhangad area